Stephan "Groda" Grothgar, sometimes credited as Stefen Grothgar, is a German film, television, and voice actor.  He is a native of Hamburg.

Grothgar has appeared in the British television series Redcap and The Bill, and had a minor part in the film Saving Private Ryan.  He has provided voices for the video games Metal Gear Solid, Sniper Elite, Richard Burns Rally, Worms 3D, and Fallout 2.

External links

 Stephan Grothgar voice actor bio
Video game voice credits at mobygames.com

Living people
Year of birth missing (living people)
German male film actors
German male television actors
German male voice actors
Male actors from Hamburg